The following is a list of television programs formerly or currently broadcast by A&E.

Current programming

Original

Reality

American Justice (1992–2005; 2020–present)
City Confidential (1998–2005; 2021–present)
Cold Case Files (1999–2002; 2006; 2017; 2021–present)
The First 48 (2004–present)
Intervention (2005–present)
After The First 48 (2009–2014; 2020; 2022–present)
Storage Wars (2010–present)
Nightwatch (2015–17; 2021–present)
Zombie House Flipping (2019–present)
Court Cam (2019–present)
Accused: Guilty Or Innocent? (2020–present)
Killer Cases (2020–present)
WWE's Most Wanted Treasures (2021–present)
Triple Digit Flip (2021–present)
I Survived a Serial Killer (2021–present)
Neighborhood Wars (2021–present)
50/50 Flip (2022–present)
Deep Fried Dynasty (2022–present)
Flipping Down South (2022–present)
Taking the Stand (2022–present)
Interrogation Raw (2022–present)
Living Smaller (2022–present)
First Blood (2022–present)
Panic 911 (2012–13, 2022–present)
Digital Addiction (2022–present)
Road Wars (2022–present)
Court Night Live (2022–present)
Inmate to Roommate (2022–present)
Customer Wars (2022-present)
Christmas Wars (2022-present)
24 Hour Flip (2023-present)

Docuseries

Biography: WWE Legends  (2021–present)
Origins of Hip Hop (2022–present)
Bobby Brown: Every Little Step (2022–present)
WWE Rivals (2022–present)
WWE Smack Talk (2022–present)

Upcoming programming
Secret Sauce with Todd Graves (March 4, 2023)
The Torso Killer Confessions (March 9, 2023)
Butchers of the Bayou (March 16, 2023)
Stone Cold Takes on America (April 30, 2023)

Former programming

Original programming

Reality

An Evening at the Improv (1982–96)
Pulaski, the TV Detective (1988–90)
Improv Tonite (1989–93)
Caroline's Comedy Hour (1989–95)
Breakfast with the Arts (1991–2007)
Comedy on the Road (1991–94; 1996)
First Flights (1991–93)Investigative Reports (1991–2004)America's Castles (1994–2005)Ancient Mysteries (1994–98)Mysteries of the Bible (1994–98)Live by Request (1996–2004)The Big House (1998)Christianity: The First Two Thousand Years (1998)A&E Top 10 (1999–2000)All Year Round with Katie Brown (2003)Makeover Mamas (2003)Take This Job (2003)Sell This House (2003–11, 2022)Airline (2004–05)Growing Up Gotti (2004–05)Family Plots (2004–05)Find & Design (2004–08)Dog the Bounty Hunter (2004–12)Bearing Witness (2005)Caesar's 24/7 (2005)Criss Angel Mindfreak (2005–10)Fatherhood (2005–06)Random 1 (2005–06)Flip This House (2005–09) Inked (2005–06)Knievel's Wild Ride (2005)Move This House (2005–07)Big Spender (2006)Designing Blind (2006)God or the Girl (2006) Rollergirls (2006)Spying on Myself (2006)Dallas SWAT (2006–07)Driving Force (2006–07)King of Cars (2006–07)Gene Simmons Family Jewels (2006–12)Clean This House (2007)Jackpot Diaries (2007)Sons of Hollywood (2007)Confessions of a Matchmaker (2007–08)The Two Coreys (2007–08)Paranormal State (2007–11)Private Sessions (2007–11)Psychic Kids (2008–10; 2019)Crime 360 (2008–09)Jacked: Auto Theft Task Force  (2008)Manhunters: Fugitive Task Force (2008)Parking Wars (2008–12)Rocco Gets Real (2008)Rookies (2008–09)We Mean Business (2008)Billy the Exterminator (2009–12)The Fugitive Chronicles (2009–10)Hammertime (2009)Hoarders (2009–13; 2016–21)The Jacksons: A Family Dynasty (2009–10)Keyshawn Johnson: Tackling Design (2009)Obsessed  (2009–10)Steven Seagal: Lawman (2009–10)Tattoo Highway (2009)$100 Makeover (2010)Drill Team (2010)Growing Up Twisted (2010)The Hasselhoffs (2010)Kirstie Alley's Big Life (2010)Paranormal Cops (2010)The Peacemaker: L.A. Gang Wars (2010)Runaway Squad (2010)
 The Squad: Prison Police (2010)Strange Days with Bob Saget (2010)Teach: Tony Danza (2010)Fix This Kitchen (2010–11)Fix This Yard (2010–12)American Hoggers (2011–13)Beyond Scared Straight (2011–15)Bordertown: Laredo (2011)Disaster Guy (2011)The First 48: Missing Persons (2011–13)Flipping Vegas (2011–14)Heavy (2011)Lady Hoggers (2011)Monster In-Laws (2011)Relapse (2011)Storage Wars: Texas (2011–14)Barter Kings (2012–14)Be the Boss (2012)Cajun Justice (2012)Duck Dynasty (2012–17)
Flipped Off (2012)
Hideous Houses (2012)
Last Chance Driving School (2012)
Shipping Wars (2012–15; 2021–22)
Bad Ink (2013–14)
Breaking Boston (2013)
Flipping Boston (2013–14)
The Governor's Wife (2013)
The Killer Speaks (2013)
Modern Dads (2013)
Psychic Tia (2013)
Rodeo Girls (2013)
Southie Rules (2013)
Storage Wars: New York (2013)
Storage Wars: Northern Treasures (2013–2015)
Barry'd Treasure (2014)
Big Smo (2014–15)
Brandi & Jarrod: Married to the Job (2014)
Cement Heads (2014)
Country Bucks (2014–15)
Crazy Hearts: Nashville (2014)
Dead Again (2014)
 Dogs of War (2014)
Don't Trust Andrew Mayne (2014)
Down East Dickering (2014–15)
Duck Commander: Before the Dynasty (2014)
Epic Ink (2014)
Escaping Polygamy (2014–17, moved to Lifetime)
Extreme Builds (2014)
Godfather of Pittsburgh (2014)
Lone Star Lady (2014)
Love Prison (2014)
Tiny House Nation (2014–2019)
Wahlburgers (2014–19)
Wild Transport (2014–15)
 8 Minutes (2015)
American Takedown (2015)
Behind Bars: Rookie Year (2015–16)
Born This Way (2015–19)
Cursed: The Bell Witch (2015)
Donnie Loves Jenny (2015–16)
Fear: Buried Alive (2015)
Lachey's: Raising the Bar (2015)
Neighbors with Benefits (2015)
Sexy Beasts (2015)
Storage Wars: Miami (2015–16)
Surviving Marriage (2015)
Fit to Fat to Fit (2016, moved to Lifetime)
 Jep and Jessica: Growing the Dynasty (2016)
The Killing Season (2016)
Streets of Compton (2016)
Black and White (2016)
The Extractors (2016)
Going Si-ral (2016–17)
Leah Remini: Scientology and the Aftermath (2016–19)
Live PD (2016–20)
60 Days In (2016–20)
Akil the Fugitive Hunter (2017)
The Eleven (2017)
The Lowe Files (2017)
Who Killed Tupac? (2017)
The Menendez Murders: ErikTells All (2017)
The Murder of Laci Peterson (2017)
Live PD: Police Patrol (2017–20)
Cultureshock (2018)
Cults and Extreme Belief (2018)
Flip Wars (2018)
Live PD Presents: PD Cam (2018–20)
Marcia Clark Investigates The First 48 (2018)
Grace vs. Abrams (2018)
Undercover High (2018)
Rooster & Butch (2018)
Very Superstitious with George Lopez (2018)
Divided States (2018)
Born Behind Bars (2018)
The Clinton Affair (2018)
Nightwatch Nation (2018)
Raising Tourette's (2018)
The Devil Next Door (2018)
Many Sides of Jane (2019)
The First 48 Presents: Homicide Squad Atlanta (2019)
The Toe Bro (2019)
The Untold Story (2019)
The Employables (2019)
Hero Ink (2019)
60 Days In: Narcoland (2019)
Addiction Unplugged (2019)
The Day I Picked My Parents (2019)
Behind Bars: Women Inside (2019)
Live PD: Wanted (2019–20)
Ghost Hunters (2019–20)
Live Rescue (2019–21)
Kids Behind Bars: Life or Parole (2019–21)
Alaska PD (2020)
Celebrity Ghost Stories (2020)
Extreme Unboxing (2020)
What's It Worth? (2020)
Rescue Cam (2020–21)
America's Top Dog (2020–21)
Nature Gone Wild (2021)
Court Cam Presents Under Oath (2021)
I Survived a Crime (2021)
Invisible Monsters: Serial Killers in America (2021)
Hustle & Tow (2021)
An Animal Saved My Life (2021)
Fasten Your Seatbelt (2021)
Dirty Rotten Cleaners (2021)
BTK: Confession of a Serial Killer (2022)
Secrets of Playboy (2022)
Secrets of the Chippendale Murders (2022)
Adults Adopting Adults (2022)

Drama

100 Centre Street (2001–02)
Nero Wolfe (2001–02)
The Cleaner (2008–09)
The Beast (2009)
The Glades (2010–13)
Breakout Kings (2011–12)
Longmire (2012–14)
Bates Motel (2013–17)
Those Who Kill (2014)
The Returned (2015)
Unforgettable (2015–16)
Damien (2016)

Miniseries
The Andromeda Strain (2008)
Bag of Bones (2011)
Coma (2012)
The Enfield Haunting (2015)

Web exclusives

Cosby: The Women Speak
O.J. Speaks: the Hidden Tapes

Syndicated programming

Breaking Away (1985–88)
Alas Smith and Jones (1985–89)
Buffalo Bill (1986–89)
United States (1986)
Yes, Prime Minister (1986–89)
Amanda's (1986–88)
The Black Adder (1987–89)
French and Saunders (1987–89)
When Things Were Rotten (1988–89)
The World of Survival (1988–91)
Victory at Sea (1988–93)
Secrets & Mysteries (1988)
Chronicle (1988–90)
Dead Head (1989)
Flambards (1989–92)
Lorne Greene's New Wilderness (1989–94)
Profiles (1989–90)
The Slap Maxwell Story (1989, 1991–92)
A Fine Romance (1989–91)
The Avengers (1990–93)
The Fugitive (1990–95)
Miss Marple (1990–97)
All Creatures Great and Small (1991–92, 1998)
Call to Glory (1991–92)
City of Angels (1991–94)
Delvecchio (1991–94)
Ellery Queen (1991–94)
Lovejoy (1991–97)
Late Night with David Letterman (1991–92)
Mrs. Columbo (1991–94)
O'Hara, U.S. Treasury (1991–94)
Emergency! (1991-2011)
The Prisoner (1991)
Rising Damp (1991–92)
World in Action (1991–92)
The House of Eliott (1992–95)
In Search of... (1992–96)
The Rockford Files (1992–96)
 Spies (1992)
Survivors (1992)
Police Story (1993–96)
Banacek (1994–98)
Columbo (1994–99, 2002)
Law & Order (1994–2002) (Seasons 1–8 only)
Lou Grant (1994–96)
McCloud (1994–99)
McMillan and Wife (1994–99)
Remington Steele (1994–96)
Agatha Christie's Poirot (1995–97)
The Equalizer (1996–2000)
Mickey Spillane's Mike Hammer (1996–98)
The New Mike Hammer (1996–97)
Quincy M.E. (1996–2000)
The Cosby Mysteries (1997–99)
Northern Exposure (1997–2001)
Murder, She Wrote (1998–2005)
A Touch of Frost (1998–99)
Simon and Simon (1999–2000)
L.A. Law (2000–02, 2003–04)
Magnum, P.I. (2000–03)
NewsRadio (2000–03)
Night Court (2000–02)
Crime Story (2001–02)
The View (2002–03)
Crossing Jordan (2002–09)
24 (2005–08)
CSI: Miami (2005–17)
Third Watch (2002–11)
Cold Case (2006-22)
Major Crimes (2019-21)
Ozzy & Jack's World Detour (2016–18)
The King of Queens (2022)
Most Daring (2021-2022)
The Rookie (2022)
Criminal Minds (2009-2016)

Documentaries
Warren Jeffs: Prophet of Evil (February 19, 2018)
Jonestown: The Women Behind the Massacre (February 26, 2018)

Short films and music videos
Kendall Ross Bean: Chopin Polonaise in A Flat (classical music video, aired in 1986)

Original films
Flight 93 (2006)

References

A&E Networks
AandE